Kani maranjandu is a species of tree crab first identified in 2017. K. maranjandu has, to date, only been observed in the forests of the Western Ghats in Kerala, India. , it is the only species in the genus Kani.

Taxonomy 
Kani maranjandu represents a newly discovered genus (Kani), named for the local Kani tribe. The discoverers have placed the genus within the family Gecarcinucidae.

Characteristics 
Kani maranjandu is distinguished from other crabs of the family Gecarcinidae by its distinctive carapace and the structure of the male abdomen, as well as its very long walking legs. The species is entirely arboreal, relying on water held in small hollows of trees for survival.

Distribution
Kani maranjandu type locality is the Thiruvananthapuram district of Kerala in the Western Ghats. It is endemic to this area.

References 

Grapsoidea
Terrestrial crustaceans
Crustaceans described in 2017
Arthropods of India
Fauna of Kerala